Northgate & Three Bridges is an electoral division of West Sussex in the United Kingdom, and returns one member to sit on West Sussex County Council.

Extent
The division covers the neighbourhoods of Northgate and Three Bridges, which form part of the urban area of the town of Crawley, and also the large Manor Royal industrial zone.

It falls entirely within the un-parished area of Crawley Borough and comprises the following borough wards: the northern part of Northgate Ward, and Three Bridges Ward.

Election results

2013 Election
Results of the election held on 2 May 2013:

2009 Election
Results of the election held on 4 June 2009:

2005 Election
Results of the election held on 5 May 2005:

References
Election Results - West Sussex County Council

External links
 West Sussex County Council
 Election Maps

Electoral Divisions of West Sussex